Pilchinnampalayam is a village located in Pollachi Taluk, in the Coimbatore District of the Indian state of Tamil Nadu.

Geography 
The village is located 55 km south of district headquarters Coimbatore, 9 km from Anamalai, and approximately 22 km from the state capital Chennai. Cities near Pilchinnampalayam include Pollachi, Udumalaipettai, and Chittur-Thathamangalam.

Nearby villages include Somandurai (3 km), Vakkampalayam (4 km), Dhalavaipalayam (5 km), Kambalapatti (5 km), Palayur (6 km). Anamalai Taluk is to the west, Pollachi North Taluk is to the North, Kinathukadavu Taluk is to the North, Udumalpet Taluk is to the East. Pollachi, Valparai, Udumalaipettai, Chittur-Thathamangalam are the nearby Cities to Pilchinnampalayam.

Demographics 

Languages spoken include Tamil And English.

Transport

Rail 

Pollachi Jn Rail Way Station is the nearest railway station. Coimbatore Jn Railway Station is a larger station. Other stations include Udumalaippettai (29 km), Walayar (37 km) and Kollengode (39 km)..

Air 
Nearby airports are Peelamedu Airport (55 km), Kochi Airport (146 km), Calicut Airport (180 km) and Madurai Airport (185 km)

Villages in Coimbatore district